The Nigerien records in swimming are the best performances of swimmers from Niger, recognised and ratified by the Federation Nigerienne des Sports Nautiques.

All records were set in finals unless noted otherwise.

Long Course (50 m)

Men

Women

Short Course (25 m)

Men

Women

References

Niger
Records
Swimming